The Second Abe Cabinet governed Japan under the leadership of Prime Minister Shinzō Abe from December 2012 to December 2014. Following the return to power of the LDP in the 2012 general election, Abe, as party president, was elected Prime Minister by the National Diet on December 26, 2012, and presented his cabinet for swearing in by the Emperor later that day. Abe formed a coalition with the New Komeito Party, which has partnered with the LDP since the late 1990s, appointing former leader Akihiro Ota as Minister of Land. Together the two parties controlled a two-thirds majority in the House of Representatives, allowing the new government in most matters to override the veto of the upper house which was controlled by the opposition parties until July 2013.

This cabinet was the most stable in post-war Japanese history, with no ministerial changes for 617 days until Abe conducted a reshuffle on September 3, 2014. The core ministers for Finance, Foreign Affairs, Economic Revival, Education, Land and the Chief Cabinet Secretary were all kept in post. In addition, Abe promoted 3 women to cabinet, matching the Koizumi cabinet's record of 5 women ministers.

Following the 2014 general election, the Second Abe cabinet was dissolved on December 24, 2014, and replaced with the Third Abe cabinet.

Election of the Prime Minister

Lists of Ministers 

R = Member of the House of Representatives
C = Member of the House of Councillors

Cabinet

Reshuffled Cabinet

Changes 
 October 20 – Justice Minister Midori Matsushima and Economy Minister Yūko Obuchi, both resigned due to campaign finance scandals, and were replaced with Yōko Kamikawa and Yoichi Miyazawa, respectively. This reduced the number of women in cabinet to 4.

References

External links 
Pages at the Kantei (English website):
List of Ministers December 2012 – September 2014
List of Ministers September 2014 – December 2014

Cabinet of Japan
2012 establishments in Japan
2014 disestablishments in Japan
Cabinets established in 2012
Cabinets disestablished in 2014
2012 in Japanese politics
Shinzo Abe